Anita Stevenson is a female former international table tennis player from England.

Table tennis career
She represented England at the 1979 World Table Tennis Championships in the Corbillon Cup (women's team event) with Jill Hammersley, and Karen Witt.

She won a bronze medal at the European Table Tennis Championships and won two English National Table Tennis Championships in the doubles with Carole Knight. Her representative county was Leicestershire.

See also
 List of England players at the World Team Table Tennis Championships

References

English female table tennis players
Living people
Year of birth missing (living people)